Piz Vallatscha is a mountain of the Sesvenna Range of the Alps, located north of the Ofen Pass in the canton of Graubünden.

References

External links
 Piz Vallatscha on Hikr

Mountains of the Alps
Mountains of Graubünden
Mountains of Switzerland